Adolf Friedrich Stenzler (July 9, 1807 – February 27, 1887) was a German Indologist born in Wolgast.

He initially studied theology and Oriental languages at the University of Greifswald under Johann Gottfried Ludwig Kosegarten (1792–1860), then furthered his education at the University of Berlin with Franz Bopp (1791–1861) and at the University of Bonn under August Wilhelm Schlegel (1767–1845). In 1829 he earned his doctorate, then continued his studies in Paris, where he attended lectures by Antoine-Léonard de Chézy (1773–1832) and Silvestre de Sacy (1758–1838). Afterwards, he worked in the library of the British East India Company in London.

In 1833 he was appointed associate professor of Oriental languages at the University of Breslau, where in 1847 he became a full professor. At Breslau he was an instructor of Arabic and Persian, later giving classes on Sanskrit and comparative linguistics. From 1836 onward, he worked as curator of the university library. His students at Breslau included Lucian Scherman (1864-1946), Franz Kielhorn (1840-1908), Richard Pischel (1849-1908) and Thomas Rhys Davids (1843-1922).

Stenzler was a pioneer of Sanskrit studies in Germany. In 1868 he published his best written work, a highly regarded textbook on Sanskrit grammar and vocabulary, titled Elementarbuch der Sanskrit-Sprache. He made significant contributions in his research of Indian literature in regards to law and medicine.

In 1866 he became a corresponding member in the Royal Prussian Academy of Sciences.

References 
 This article is based on a translation of an equivalent article at the German Wikipedia, sources listed as:
 Stenzler, Adolf Friedrich In: Meyers Konversations-Lexikon. 4. Auflage. Band 15, Verlag des Bibliographischen Instituts, Leipzig/ Wien 1885–1892, S. 292.
 Richard Pischel : Stenzler, Adolf Friedrich In: Allgemeine Deutsche Biographie (ADB). Band 36, Duncker & Humblot, Leipzig 1893, S. 59–61.

1807 births
1887 deaths
People from Wolgast
People from Swedish Pomerania
German Indologists
German librarians
Humboldt University of Berlin alumni
University of Greifswald alumni
Academic staff of the University of Breslau
German male non-fiction writers